Calliurichthys is a subgenus of Callionymus, a genus dragonets, native to the western Pacific Ocean. Some authorities consider it to be a valid genus.

Species
There are currently two recognized species in this subgenus:
 Callionymus izuensis (R. Fricke & Zaiser Brownell, 1993)
 Callionymus scaber (McCulloch, 1926)

References

Callionymidae
Taxa named by David Starr Jordan
Taxa named by Henry Weed Fowler
Animal subgenera